The 1959 Hickory 250 was a NASCAR Grand National Series event that was held on May 2, 1959, at Hickory Speedway in Hickory, North Carolina.

Harlan Richardson would make his grand debut into the NASCAR Cup Series during this event.

Background
Hickory Motor Speedway is a short track located in Hickory, North Carolina.  It is one of stock car racing's most storied venues, and is often referred to as the "World's Most Famous Short Track" and the "Birthplace of the NASCAR Stars".

The track first opened in 1951 as a  dirt track.  Gwyn Staley won the first race at the speedway and later became the first track champion.  Drivers such as Junior Johnson, Ned Jarrett, and Ralph Earnhardt also became track champions in the 1950s, with Earnhardt  winning five of them.

In 1953, NASCAR's Grand National Series visited the track for the first time.  Tim Flock won the first race at the speedway, which became a regular part of the Grand National schedule.  After winning his track championship in 1952, Junior Johnson became the most successful Grand National driver at Hickory, winning there seven times.

The track has been re-configured three times in its history.  The track became a 0.4-mile (644 meters) dirt track in 1955, which was paved for the first time during the 1967 season.

Race report
There were 21 drivers who were on the starting grid for this 250-lap racing event. Drivers who were on the lead lap were Junior Johnson, Speedy Thompson, Joe Weatherly, and Buck Baker. Eleven drivers were knocked out of the race due to various vehicle-related problems; Rex White was credited with the last-place finish due to troubles with his transmission on lap 27. All of the drivers were born in the United States of America. Only four cautions slowed the race for an undetermined number of laps. Five thousand people eventually got to see Junior Johnson defeat Joe Weatherly by two and a half laps.

The entire race was done on a dirt track. Delta Auto Sales was the only "corporate" sponsor for the drivers in this event. Model years for the vehicles ranged from 1957 to 1959. Most of the field were driving Chevrolet stock cars.

The time it took the race to go from the first green flag to the checkered flag was one hour and thirty-six minutes. Individual prize winnings for each driver ranged from the winner's share of $800 ($ when adjusted for inflation) to the last-place finishers' share of $50 ($ when adjusted for inflation). The entire prize purse for this event added up to $3,375 ($ when adjusted for inflation).

Qualifying

Finishing order
Section reference:

 Junior Johnson (No. 11)
 Joe Weatherly (No. 41)
 Lee Petty (No. 42)
 Ken Rush (No. 40)
 Cotton Owens (No. 6)
 Speedy Thompson* (No. 1)
 Shep Langdon (No. 64)
 L.D. Austin (No. 74)
 Ned Jarrett (No. 38)
 Herman Beam (No. 19)
 Harvey Hege (No. 81)
 Harlan Richardson* (No. 22)
 Jim Reed* (No. 7)
 G.C. Spencer* (No. 34)
 Buck Baker* (No. 87)
 Bobby Keck* (No. 96)
 Buck Brigance* (No. 39)
 Bobby Waddell* (No. 45)
 Jimmy Pardue* (No. 27)
 Bunk Moore* (No. 0)
 Rex White* (No. 5)

* Driver failed to finish race

Timeline
Section reference:
 Start of race: Junior Johnson started with the pole position.
 Lap 26: Speedy Thompson took over the lead from Junior Johnson.
 Lap 27: Transmission problems would knock Rex White into a last-place finish.
 Lap 28: Bunk Moore's racing weekend would end due to engine failure.
 Lap 51: Joe Weatherly took over the lead from Speedy Thompson.
 Lap 81: Bobby Waddell's piston would stop working properly, ending his racing weekend.
 Lap 101: Buck Baker took over the lead from Joe Weatherly.
 Lap 125: Speedy Thompson took over the lead from Buck Baker.
 Lap 133: The fan on Bobby Keck's vehicle stopped working, forcing him to withdraw from the race.
 Lap 167: Buck Baker had oil pressure issues that would prevent him from winning the race.
 Lap 179: The transmission on G.C. Spencer's vehicle stopped working, ending his race weekend.
 Lap 238: Junior Johnson took over the lead from Speedy Thompson.
 Finish: Junior Johnson wins the race.

References

Hickory 250
Hickory 250
NASCAR races at Hickory Motor Speedway